The Mini Coupe is a single engine, single place, aluminum construction, low-wing aircraft with a twin rudder layout. The aircraft shares the same basic configuration as the larger Erco Ercoupe, providing the basis for the name Mini Coupe. The complete parts kit for the aircraft is no longer sold. Plans are available for scratch building the aircraft.

Development

The Mini Coupe was designed to be built using simple tools and techniques, relying on extensive use of pop-riveted aluminum construction. The ailerons and twin rudders are push-pull tube operated. The original kit was sold in 1974 for $1694 with a total parts cost of about $2400. The kit included all construction materials for the aircraft. If built to specifications, it meets the requirements to be certified as an Experimental Aircraft meeting Light Sport Aircraft criteria.

The Mini Coupe kit rights were marketed by Chris Tena, then Bill and Jerry Johnson (Bill Johnson and Chris Tenea were one and the same; Chris was Bill's wife, after whom he named the airplane.) "Sport International", then finally Buck Sport Aviation.

Specifications (Mini Coupe with VW Engine)

References

Homebuilt aircraft
Light-sport aircraft